Konush Hill (‘Konushki Halm’ \'ko-nush-ki 'h&lm\) is the ice-covered hill rising to 550 m in the north foothills of Louis-Philippe Plateau on Trinity Peninsula in Graham Land, Antarctica.  It is surmounting Sestrimo Glacier to the east and Lafond Bay to the north.

The hill is named after the settlements of Konush, Haskovo Province in Southern Bulgaria.

Location
German-British mapping in 1996.

Maps
 Trinity Peninsula. Scale 1:250000 topographic map No. 5697. Institut für Angewandte Geodäsie and British Antarctic Survey, 1996.
 Antarctic Digital Database (ADD). Scale 1:250000 topographic map of Antarctica. Scientific Committee on Antarctic Research (SCAR). Since 1993, regularly updated.

References
 Konush Hill. SCAR Composite Antarctic Gazetteer
 Bulgarian Antarctic Gazetteer. Antarctic Place-names Commission. (details in Bulgarian, basic data in English)

External links
 Konush Hill. Copernix satellite image

Hills of Trinity Peninsula
Bulgaria and the Antarctic